Lycée Théodore Monod or Lycée Français Théodore Monod (LFTM) can refer to:
 Lycée d'Enseignement Général et Technologique Agricole Théodore Monod (LEGTA) in Le Rheu, France
 Lycée professionnel Théodore-Monod in Noisy-le-Sec, France (Paris area)
 Lycée Français Théodore Monod (LFTM) in Nouakchott, Mauritania.
 Lycée Français Théodore Monod (LfTM or LTM) in Abu Dhabi, United Arab Emirates